Parvaneh Pourshariati is an Iranian-born American historian of Middle Eastern studies, scholar, and educator. She is an Associate Professor of History at New York City College of Technology (CUNY), and former president of the Association for the Study of Persianate Societies. She specializes in the late antique, early medieval and modern histories of Iran and the Middle East.

Biography
Pourshariati was born in Tehran, Iran, in 1959. She received her masters degree from New York University (NYU) and her PhD from Columbia University. According to her profile page at CUNY, her research "focuses on the social and cultural history and interconnections of the Middle East, the Caucasus, Iran and Central Asia".

She is a member of the editorial board of the Journal of Persianate Studies and Iran Namag.

In 2006, in memory of her father, the late Houshang Pourshariati, Pourshariati established the bi-annual Houshang Pourshariati Iranian Studies Book Award, which has been administered through the Middle East Studies Association of North America (MESA), ever since.

Pourshariati was a visiting fellow at Princeton University in Summer 2013 and a visiting scholar at Hebrew University of Jerusalem in 2012. In 2015 to 2016 she was a visiting research scholar at New York University. From 2000 to 2014 she served in the Department of Near Eastern Languages and Cultures at The Ohio State University.

Works
Decline and Fall of the Sasanian Empire: The Sasanian-Parthian Confederacy and the Arab Conquest of Iran.

References

External links
  The Epic of Samak Ayar: Parvaneh Pourshariati's Lecture at the European Iranology Conference, Berlin, 2019. via youtube.com

1959 births
Living people
Iranologists
20th-century American historians
21st-century American historians
20th-century Iranian historians
21st-century Iranian historians
Columbia University alumni
City University of New York faculty
Princeton University faculty
Academic staff of the Hebrew University of Jerusalem
New York University faculty
Ohio State University faculty
Middle Eastern studies scholars
Caucasologists
Central Asian studies scholars
Historians of Iran
People from Tehran
Iranian emigrants to the United States